The United States Senate Committee on Coast Defenses was created in 1885 to deal with the country's coastal defenses.  It was abolished in 1921.

Chairmen of the Committee on Coast Defenses, 1885-1921
Joseph Dolph (R-OR) 1885-1891
Watson Squire (R-WA) 1891-1893
John Gordon (D-GA) 1893-1895
Watson Squire (R-WA) 1895-1897
Joseph R. Hawley (R-CT) 1897
George W. McBride (R-OR) 1898-1901
John H. Mitchell (R-OR) 1901-1905
Philander C. Knox (R-PA) 1905-1908
George S. Nixon (R-NV) 1908-1911
Charles Curtis (R-KS) 1911-1913
James E. Martine (D-NJ) 1913-1914
Blair Lee I (D-MD) 1914-1917
Charles S. Thomas (D-CO) 1917-1919
Joseph S. Frelinghuysen (R-NJ) 1919-1921

Coast Defenses
1885 establishments in Washington, D.C.
1921 disestablishments in Washington, D.C.